Plains Exploration & Production was a petroleum and natural gas exploration company based in Houston, Texas. In May 2013, it was acquired by Freeport-McMoRan.

History
In 2002, the company was separated from Plains Resources Inc. via a corporate spin-off.

In 2003, the company acquired 3TEC for $313 million. In 2004, it and acquired Nuevo Energy for $945 million. These acquisitions gave the company petroleum-producing assets in the Southwestern United States and California.

In 2007, the company acquired Pogo Producing for $3.6 billion in cash and stock.

In 2008, the company formed a joint venture with Chesapeake Energy in the Haynesville Shale. To fund the venture, the company sold assets in the Permian Basin and the Piceance Basin to Occidental Petroleum for $1.3 billion.

In 2011, the company sold natural gas assets for $785 million, including a $600 million sale of assets in the Granite Wash to Linn Energy.

In 2012, the company acquired assets in the Gulf of Mexico from BP and Royal Dutch Shell.

Operations
The company's operations were all in Wyoming, California, Texas, Louisiana, Wyoming, and offshore of California and in the Gulf of Mexico. It also had a prospect offshore of Vietnam.

In California, it was a principal operator on fields including Cymric Oil Field and the South Belridge Oil Field in Kern County and Inglewood Oil Field in Los Angeles County.

Approximately 39% of production was heavy crude oil, almost all of which was sold to Phillips 66. Valero Energy was also a major customer of the company, accounting for 17% of revenues in 2012.

Attempts to drill in the Tranquillon Ridge in Santa Barbara County

As part of the deal, the company would have drilled into Tranquillon Ridge only from the existing Platform Irene and would have retired the platform entirely in 2022. The project would have given the state of California $2 billion and Santa Barbara County about $350 million in tax revenues during that time. The County Board of Supervisors voted to approve the project and sent it on to the State Lands Commission, which rejected it by a 2 to 1 vote on January 29, 2009, citing the unenforceability of the sunset clause. In May 2009, California Governor Arnold Schwarzenegger revived the project by including it in a revised budget proposal. However, the proposal did not pass.

References

Companies established in 2002
2002 establishments in Texas